The Serra Hills languages form a branch of Skou languages. They are spoken in the Serra Hills of Sandaun Province, Papua New Guinea.

Languages are,
Puari, Rawo, Womo, Sumararu

References

 
Eastern Skou languages